The Supply class is a class of replenishment oilers of the Royal Australian Navy, a role that combines the missions of a tanker and stores supply ship. As such they are designated auxiliary oiler replenisher (AOR). They are tasked with providing ammunition, fuel, food and other supplies to Royal Australian Navy vessels around the world. The project is expected to cost anywhere between $1 and $2 billion. Navantia were selected to build a design based on the Spanish Navy's current replenishment vessel , which entered service in 2011.

Planning

A number of designs were considered by the Australian Government for their replacement tankers, with Navantia competing against the Aegir variant of the  built by South Korea's DSME in a restricted tender competition. Navantia's proposal based on Cantabria was announced as the successful design in the Australian tender in March 2016, with an expected in service date for the first of two vessels of late 2019.

Construction
The class of ships based on Navantia's replenishment oiler were built at the Navantia shipyard in Ferrol, Spain. The first ship, Supply, arrived at Fleet Base West in October 2020 to begin fitting Australia-specific equipment prior to her service entry in April 2021.

The second ship, Stalwart, departed for Australia in May 2021 and arrived in late June.

Operational history
HMAS Supply commissioned at Fleet Base East on 10 April 2021.

HMAS Stalwart commissioned at Fleet Base West on 13 November 2021.

Ships

Gallery

Citations

Further reading
 Navantia - Supply class AORs

External links

 Official RAN page for Supply-class AOR
 Launch of Nuship Supply
 Rear above view of launch of Nuship Supply

Auxiliary replenishment ship classes
Tankers of the Royal Australian Navy